The 1889 Amherst football team was an American football team that represented the Amherst College as a member of the Eastern Intercollegiate Football Association (EIFA) during the 1889 college football season. The team compiled an overall record of 3–5–2 and was outscored by a total of 198 to 173.

Schedule

References

Amherst
Amherst Mammoths football seasons
Amherst football